Kenth Eldebrink (born 14 May 1955 in Morjärv) is a retired Swedish athlete who mainly competed in the men's javelin throw event.

He competed for Sweden at the 1984 Summer Olympics held in Los Angeles, California, where he won the bronze medal in the men's javelin throw event. He retired in 1986.

He is the older brother of the former ice hockey player Anders Eldebrink. His twin daughters, Frida and Elin, are professional basketball players.

Achievements

References

sports-reference

1955 births
Swedish male javelin throwers
Olympic bronze medalists for Sweden
Athletes (track and field) at the 1984 Summer Olympics
Olympic athletes of Sweden
Living people
Olympic bronze medalists in athletics (track and field)
Medalists at the 1984 Summer Olympics